Jessica Rodén (born 1976) is a Swedish politician.  she serves as Member of the Riksdag representing the constituency of Västra Götaland County South. She is affiliated with the Social Democrats.

References 

Living people
1976 births
Place of birth missing (living people)
21st-century Swedish politicians
21st-century Swedish women politicians
Members of the Riksdag 2022–2026
Members of the Riksdag from the Social Democrats
Women members of the Riksdag